Šimkaičiai (Samogitian: Šėmkātē) is a town in Jurbarkas district municipality, Taurage County, Lithuania. According to the 2001 census, the town had a population of 265 people. At the 2011 census, the population was 204.

Before World War II the town had a Jewish population. In July, 1941, they were murdered by the Einsatzgruppen and their Lithuanian collaborators.

References

Towns in Lithuania
Towns in Tauragė County
Rossiyensky Uyezd
Holocaust locations in Lithuania